Herboxidiene is a polyketide molecule soluble in polar solvents such as water, ethanol, n-butanol and acetone but insoluble in non-polar molecule such as hexane. It was first isolated from the fermentation broth of Streptomyces chromofuscus by researchers in Monsanto Company in 1992. Herboxidiene shows in vitro antitumor activity by targeting the SF3B protein in the splicesosome. Many antitumor derivatives have also been developed from herboxidiene through chemical modification.

Structure
Compared to other polyketide compounds, herboxidiene has a unique epoxide functional group. This structure results a relative low yield in the chemical synthesis of herboxidiene as the epoxidation usually accompany with other oxidized products such as ketones, carboxylic acids and aldehydes.

Multiple chiral centers are another bottleneck in the chemical synthesis of herboxidiene. There are nine chiral centers in the herboxidiene molecule and stereoselective methods are necessities of herboxidiene synthesis.

Biosynthesis
Biosynthesis of herboxidiene has been studied for over 20 years since its discovery. The precursor of herboxidiene, 18-deoxy-25-demethyl herboxitriene was first synthesized in Streptomyces chromofuscus through a nine-modules PKS I pathway. 18-Deoxy-25-demethyl herboxitriene is then epoxidized by enzyme HerE on the carbon carbon double bond between C14 and C15, oxidized by enzyme HerG on C-18 and eventually methylated by enzyme HerF on C25 to herboxidiene with the help of cofactor S-adenosyl methionine (SAM).

Anti-tumor mechanism
Herboxdiene suppresses the growth of tumor cells by interfering the splicing of pre-mRNA coding for cell cycle regulation proteins in our body. The target of herboxidiene was discovered in 2011. In their research they discovered herboxidiene can bind with SAP155, one of the seven spliceosome-associated proteins that consist splicing factor SF3b. By binding SF3b, herboxidiene can trigger accumulation of both protein p27 and its C-terminus truncated version p27*. p27 and p27* are important proteins that regulate cell cycle of mammalian cells. Accumulation of p27 and p27* result in the inhibition of cells from entering G1 and S phase of the cell cycle and therefore can contain the growth of tumor cells.

References

Polyketides
Epoxides
Carboxylic acids
Dienes